Trillium petiolatum, the Idaho trillium, also known as the long-petioled trillium or round-leaved trillium, is a species of flowering plant in the family Melanthiaceae. It is native to the northwestern United States, in Idaho, Oregon, and Washington. The type specimen for this species was gathered by Meriwether Lewis in 1806 along the Clearwater River (originally called Koos-Koos-Kai-Kai by the Nez Perce people) during the return trip of the Lewis and Clark Expedition.

Description

Trillium petiolatum is "without question the least Trillium-like of all trilliums." The round-ovate blades are green but not mottled. The petiolate leaves strongly resemble the leaves of the common plantain. Pursh himself observed that T. petiolatum "has leaves very much like Plantago major."

Consequently the leaf-whorl and the sessile flower sit at or near ground level. The petals are red, maroon, or purple, but yellow-flowered forms devoid of purple pigments have been identified. Due to its small size and uncharacteristic leaf structure (for a trillium), the plant is inconspicuous and easily overlooked.

Trillium petiolatum shows similarities to both T. sessile and T. recurvatum. Of the sessile trilliums, only T. recurvatum and T. petiolatum have petiolate leaves, but apart from this, the two species have little else in common. Based on flower parts and reproductive organs, T. petiolatum appears to be more closely related to T. sessile.

Distribution
Trillium petiolatum is native to the mountainous areas of the northwestern United States, in Idaho, Oregon, and Washington.

Ecology
Trillium petiolatum flowers very early April to late May (depending upon conditions and elevation) but it may bloom earlier upon south-facing slopes. No other Trillium species survives in such harsh conditions. Only the habitat of Pseudotrillium rivale, a close relative, approaches the habitat of T. petiolatum in terms of exposure, openness, and seasonal dryness. Like T. ovatum, T. petiolatum does not do well in eastern gardens.

Like other Trillium species, T. petiolatum has a one-leaf vegetative stage followed by a three-leaf vegetative (juvenile) stage. After several years of vegetative growth, the plant finally reaches its three-leaf reproductive (flowering) stage. It has an indefinite life span of many years.

Bibliography

References

External links

Oregon Flora Project

petiolatum
Flora of Idaho
Flora of Oregon
Flora of Washington (state)
Endemic flora of the United States
Plants described in 1813
Taxa named by Frederick Traugott Pursh